Herman James Stegeman (January 21, 1891 – October 22, 1939) was a player and coach of American football, basketball, baseball, and track and field athletics, and a college athletics administrator.  He served as the head football coach at Beloit College (1915), Monmouth College (1916–1917), and the University of Georgia (1920–1922), compiling a career college football coaching record of 29–17–6.  At Georgia, Stegeman was also the head basketball coach (1919–1931), head baseball coach (1919–1920), and head track and field coach (1920–1937).

Early years and playing career
Stegeman was born and raised in Holland, Michigan, and was of Dutch descent. He attended the University of Chicago, where he starred in many sports, including track and field and football under the direction of the legendary Amos Alonzo Stagg. Stegeman played on the school's 1913 National Championship football squad, and was hailed by his coach, Stagg, as one of the finest athletes he had ever had the privilege of coaching. After playing football for another season in 1914, Stegeman graduated from Chicago with a Bachelor of Philosophy (Ph.B.) in 1915.

Coaching career
During the end of World War I, the United States Army stationed Stegeman in Athens to create physical training courses for the UGA Reserve Officers' Training Corps program. After arriving, he was hired by UGA's football coach, W. A. Cunningham, as an assistant for the 1919 season. When Cunningham returned to the Army after that season, Stegeman became the head coach of the football team and served in the position from 1920 to 1922. In addition, he also became the head coach of the basketball, baseball and track and field teams in 1920. His career football record stands at 20–6–3 (.741). He stepped down as baseball coach after one year.

After the 1922 football season, Stegeman stepped down from that position to become the UGA athletics director. He remained as head coach of the basketball and track and field teams. As head coach of the Georgia basketball team from 1920 until 1931, he still owns the second-best winning percentage (.686) of any Georgia coach with more than 50 games. His final group of Bulldogs won 23 of 25 games and Stegeman was regarded by many as one of the first great basketball "gurus."

Stegeman coached UGA's track and field team for 17 years and was the personal coach of Forrest "Spec" Towns, who won a gold medal at the 1936 Summer Olympics. Stegeman led the UGA track team to its only SEC men's team conference championship in 1937 with Towns as the star of the squad.

Later life and honors
In 1946, Stegeman Hall was named in honor of Stegeman and initially served as the home of the University's athletic and physical education departments; however, that building was demolished in the early 1990s in preparation for events hosted by UGA during the 1996 Summer Olympics. As a result, Charles Knapp, UGA's president at the time, led the effort to rename Georgia Coliseum as Stegeman Coliseum  in Stegeman's honor on March 2, 1996.

Stegeman died of a heart attack in Athens, Georgia in 1939.

Head coaching record

Football

References

Sources

External links
 Herman Stegeman at College Basketball at Sports-Reference.com
 Photo of Stegeman as a member of Chicago track team
 

1891 births
1939 deaths
American football guards
American people of Dutch descent
Basketball coaches from Michigan
Beloit Buccaneers football coaches
Chicago Maroons football players
College men's track and field athletes in the United States
College track and field coaches in the United States
Georgia Bulldogs and Lady Bulldogs athletic directors
Georgia Bulldogs baseball coaches
Georgia Bulldogs basketball coaches
Georgia Bulldogs football coaches
Monmouth Fighting Scots football coaches
Monmouth Fighting Scots men's basketball coaches
People from Holland, Michigan
Players of American football from Michigan